Efrat Natan is an Israeli artist.

Biography 
Efrat Natan was born and grew up on Kibbutz Kfar Ruppin in the Beit She'an Valley. She studied with Raffi Lavie. Her art was influenced by life on the kibbutz and utopian ideals.
 Her sculpture "Swing of the Scythe" (2002) is in the permanent exhibition of the Israel Museum. Composed of scythes arranged in a circle, the work draws on Natan's childhood memories growing up on a kibbutz  as well as the myth of the Zionist pioneer, symbolizing the renewed relationship between the Jews and the land.

Awards and recognition
 1979 Beatrice S. Kolliner Award for a Young Israeli Artist, Israel Museum, Jerusalem, Israel
 2002 Prize to Encourage Creativity, Ministry of Science, Culture and Sport
 2006 Ministry of Science, Culture and Sport Prize
 2006 Ministry of Education Prize for the Fine Arts
 2009: Mifal Hapayis Prize for the Fine Arts

See also
Visual arts in Israel

References

External links
 
 
 

Israeli painters
Living people
1947 births